Niccolò Grillo (fl. 1720s) was an Italian composer. He was a teacher at the Conservatory of San Onofrio, Naples until 1723.

Works
 Niccolò Grillo: Sosutose no juorno. Neapolitan cantata for tenor, strings and basso continuo.

References

18th-century Italian composers
18th-century Italian male musicians
Italian Baroque composers
Italian male classical composers